Crime in Taiwan ranges from food adulteration, bombing, assassination attempts, hostage crisis, murder etc. However, crime statistics show that crime rates in Taiwan are among the lowest in the world, and are relatively low compared to much of the developed world.

Law enforcement agencies

The National Police Agency is the top law enforcement body in Taiwan with its subordinate Criminal Investigation Bureau.

List of notable crimes

Assassination attempts
 President Chen Shui-bian and Vice President Annette Lu assassination attempt on 19 March 2004
 Presidential Office Building Truck Attack on 25 January 2014

Bombing
 Taiwan McDonald's bombings on 28-29 April 1992

Hostage crisis
 Alexander family hostage crisis on 18 November 1997

Murder
 Nantou shooting on 21 September 1959
 Murder of Peng Wan-ru on 30 November 1996
 Murder of Pai Hsiao-yen on 20 April 1997
 Murder of Weng Chi-nan on 28 May 2010
 Taipei Metro attack on 21 May 2014

Human trafficking

Sex trafficking

Taiwanese and foreign women and girls are sex trafficked in Taiwan. They are raped and harmed in brothels, hotel rooms, and other locations throughout the country.

Illegal drugs

Marijuana
Marijuana is criminalized in Taiwan with strict penalties for possession, production, and distribution. Knowledge about marijuana within Taiwan’s legal system is minimal with Judges and Prosecutors often misunderstanding or lacking an understanding of basic concepts surrounding its production and consumption.

Forced labor

Fishing industry 
Taiwan's overseas fishing fleet has been criticized for a history of abuse and a lack of protection for migrant laborers, often from Southeast Asia. Official Taiwanese sources put the number of foreign workers aboard Taiwanese vessels at 26,000 but NGOs and US government agencies put the figure around 160,000. Foreign fishermen frequently report non-payment, long work hours, and verbal and physical abuse at the hands of their captains and officers, who are often Taiwanese. In recent years Taiwan has made significant progress on the issue, but abuse remains widespread.  In terms of human rights the distant waters fishing fleet lags far behind the rest of Taiwanese industry.

A 2020 Greenpeace investigation found Taiwanese vessels in the Atlantic Ocean engaged in illegal, unreported and unregulated fishing. They also found significant evidence of the abuse of foreign laborers. They also documented Taiwanese fishing companies using flags of convenience to obscure vessel ownership as well as unreported at sea transfers of fish. Taiwanese fisheries conglomerate FCF was specifically singled out for criticism for links to illegal fishing and forced labor.

In October 2020 the US Department of Labor added the Taiwanese distant waters fleet's products to its list of goods produced by child or forced labor. In May 2021 the Control Yuan ordered the Ministry of Foreign Affairs, the Ministry of Labor, and the Fisheries Agency to address the issue and heavily criticized their lack of action.

See also
 Food safety incidents in Taiwan

References